Madison University High School (formerly James Madison High School) is a high school in Milwaukee, Wisconsin, United States, part of the Milwaukee Public Schools system. It changed its name in 1996 to reflect a higher emphasis on meeting academic standards.

Notable alumni
 Mark Maddox, (b 1968) is a former professional American football linebacker for ten seasons in the NFL for the Buffalo Bills.
 Christopher Scarver, (b 1969) convicted murderer best known for killing serial killer Jeffrey Dahmer in prison
 Dan Turk, (1962–2000) was an American football center and long snapper in the National Football League for Oakland Raiders.

References

External links
JMAC home page

High schools in Milwaukee